Andina is a single-species fungal genus in the family Teloschistaceae. It contains the crustose lichen Andina citrinoides, found in the Bolivian Andes. The genus was circumscribed in 2021 by Karina Wilk, Maciej Pabijan, and Robert Lücking. Andina has a sister taxon relationship to a clade containing Elixjohnia and Sirenophila, and all three of these genera make a clade that is sister to Teloschistopsis and Haloplaca. The generic name Andina refers to the Andes Mountains, where the type specimen was collected. The species epithet citrinoides alludes to the lichen's similarity with Flavoplaca citrina.

References

Teloschistales
Lichen species
Lichens described in 2021
Taxa named by Robert Lücking
Lichens of Bolivia